The Victoria University of Wellington Students' Association (VUWSA) is the official student association at Victoria University of Wellington, New Zealand. VUWSA was established in 1899 as the Victoria University College Students' Society.

Following the enactment of the Education (Freedom of Association) Amendment Bill, VUWSA moved from being a compulsory students' association to a voluntary one in 2012.

VUWSA funds the student magazine Salient. It also funded the student radio station Salient FM until its discontinuation.

Organisation
The Victoria University of Wellington Students' Association (VUWSA) is a representative body for students enrolled at Victoria University.

VUWSA Executive
The VUWSA Executive consists of ten positions who govern the association: the President, Academic Vice President, Welfare Vice President, Engagement Vice President, Treasurer–Secretary, Campaigns Officer, Clubs and Activities Officer, Education Officer, Eqity Officer and Sustainability Officer.

VUWSA Executive
This is the incoming VUWSA Executive for 2022, elected on 1 October 2021:

VUWSA president
Ralph Zambrano is the President for 2022.

 2021 — Michael Turnbull
 2020 — Taylah Shuker (Acting)
 2020 — Geo Robrigado (resigned)
 2019 — Tamatha Paul
 2018 — Marlon Drake
 2017 — Rory Lenihan-Ikin
 2016 — Jonathan Gee
 2015 — Rick Zwaan
 2014 — Sonya Clark
 2013 — Rory McCourt
 2012 — Bridie Hood
 2011 — Seamus Brady
 2010 — Max Hardy
 2009 — Jasmine Freemantle
 2008 — Joel Cosgrove
 2007 — Geoff Hayward
 2006 — Nick Kelly
 2005 — Jeremy Greenbrook
 2004 — Amanda Hill
 2003 — Catherine Belfield-Haines
 2002 — Fleur Fitzsimons
 2001 — Chris Hipkins
 2000 — Chris Hipkins
 1999 — Hamish Hopkinson
 1998 — Alastair Shaw
 1997 — Alastair Shaw
 1996 — Michael Gibbs
 1995 — Paul Gibson
 1994 — Juliet Gunby
 1993 — David Guerin
 1992 — Cushia Thomson
 1991 — Jeremy Baker
 1990 — Austen Sinclair
 1989 — Leanne Hansen
 1988 — Nigel Mander & Grant O'Neil
 1987 — Andrew Little
 1986 — Simon Johnson
 1985 — Stephanie Haworth
 1984 — Stephen Dawe
 1983 — Leighton Duley
 1982 — Paul Cochrane
 1981 — Virginia Adams
 1980 — Philip Sowman
 1906 — Frederick Archibald de la Mare

Staff
The association employs a number of staff who work for students and assist the executive in achieving its strategic and operational goals. They are led by the Chief Executive, who oversees the financial and operational functions of the association, and includes two student advocates who provides independent and trained representation in cases of misconduct within the university and grievances with bodies such as StudyLink, WINZ, landlords and the university, a student representation coordinator, who coordinates and trains the student representative system consisting of over 600 students ranging from class representatives and faculty delegates, along with conducting regular programme reviews and advising on university policy, an association secretary, an events manager, a communications manager, a designer, an advertising manager, receptionists, and an accounts administrator.

VUWSA Trust
The association is supported both financially and strategically by the VUWSA Trust. The trust owns Vic Books, which is a significant source of revenue. The existence of the Trust is not well known by students.

The trust was established in 1975, and built up a significant reserve of assets when membership of student organisations was compulsory. While VUWSA was still collecting membership fees, about 15% of its fees were passed on to the Trust, which had built up around $8 million of assets by 2006. The Trust money was used to support students and clubs on campus, fund long-term investments such as the Student Union Building, and also serve as a backup fund in case VUWSA became a voluntary organisation.

The trust has invested in the fit-out of the Pipitea campus gym, and has also administered the student trust scholarships, fitted out houses for disabled student access and supported Student Job Search. Most recently, the trust made a significant financial contribution to the building of the recently completed Victoria University Hub on behalf of students.

Since the introduction of voluntary student membership, the financial assistance from the trust has enabled the association to reduce its deficit gradually without rapidly depleting its cash reserves.

History

VUWSA was established in 1899 as the Victoria University College Students' Society.

Historically, VUWSA has had a reputation as a left-wing organisation. VUWSA has traditionally maintained a heavy involvement in New Zealand's social and political movements such as the Nuclear Free New Zealand Movement, the Vietnam War and the War in Iraq. In recent years, VUWSA has supported the campaign for the Prostitution Reform Bill, the Civil Union Bill, opposed initiatives to raise the legal drinking age to 20 years, and supported marriage equality.

Since 1937 VUWSA have funded student magazine Salient. Since 2007 it has funded a station radio station, currently known as Salient FM.

1990s

During the presidency of Alastair Shaw between 1997 and 1998, "VUWSA re-introduced the position of women's rights' officer, made moves towards a genuine partnership with Ngai Tauira, and organised a series of mass mobilisations that brought the government's privatisation for tertiary education plans to a halt."

2000s
In 2007, President Geoff Hayward and Education Vice-President Paul Brown signed off on spending $22,222.22 on upgrading the organisation's van, with work including tinting the windows, fitting mag-wheels and painting the van black. Subsequently, the details of the expenditure on the van were suppressed by the 2008 Executive. In 2009, the Executive and President Max Hardy apologised to the student body for the misappropriation of funds on the van, and it was announced that the broken down van was to be sold in an attempt to regain some of the original expenditure. Hardy said: "I think we can now put the shameful VUWSA van controversy behind us".

Also in 2007, Salient revealed that acting Women's Rights Officer Clelia Opie had spent over $4,000 of VUWSA funds on psychic hotlines. She was subsequently dismissed from the role.

In 2008, President Joel Cosgrove courted controversy by wearing a T-shirt which said "I (heart) my penis" to a graduation ceremony in an official capacity. Cosgrove was attempting to promote sexual health for men, but his choice of clothing was widely criticised and labelled embarrassing.

In May 2009, President Jasmine Freemantle, who had run for president on a Workers' Party platform, was expelled from the Workers' Party. Furthermore, the Party called for her resignation as VUWSA President. The Party justified its actions by arguing that: "Her actions indicate outright rejection in practice of basic WP – and basic left-wing – principles." Freemantle wrote a long blog post in response, arguing that: "The reality is that my expulsion from the WP says more about the current direction the Party than it does about my politics, or the work I'm currently doing in my role as VUWSA President."

Campaign against voluntary student membership
In October 2009, Act on Campus orchestrated a special general meeting, and successfully passed a motion "that VUWSA actively supports the Education (Freedom of Association) Amendment Bill" by 45 votes to 35. The bill's aim was to introduce voluntary student membership. However, President Jasmine Freemantle subsequently announced that the motion had been declared null and void by the association's lawyer.

VUWSA actively campaigned against the passing of voluntary student membership in 2010.

Initial stages of voluntary student membership: 2012–2013

Passing of VSM legislation and impacts

Following the passing of Heather Roy's Education (Freedom of Association) Amendment Bill in 2011, membership of students' associations became voluntary from the beginning of 2012. In response to the passing of the legislation, VUWSA held a Special General Meeting on 13 October  which approved a lowering of membership fees to $0. President Seamus Bradie said that "VUWSA wants to ensure that there are no financial barriers that may deter students from gaining independent representation and having a voice in issues that affect them". He also argued that despite the fact that the association would be funded in the future indirectly through the Student Services Levy which the university collects, the association would remain completely independent.

The effect of VSM on VUWSA's financial position has been significant, with the organisation's income dropping from $2.25 million in 2011 to less than $700,000 in 2013. This drop in income has meant that VUWSA has run a deficit in both 2012 and 2013, funded from pre-VSM cash reserves and grants from the VUWSA Trust. However, VUWSA President for 2013, Rory McCourt, has suggested that the organisation could be out of deficit by as early as 2014.

Salient has argued that although VSM has meant student associations are more stringent and careful in spending student money, the post-VSM environment has reduced financial accountability from the magazine's perspective. This is because the VUWSA Executive is able to move into committee when discussing contracts with the university, thereby barring the magazine from publishing any information about those proceedings. In contrast, under compulsory student membership, Salient was able to criticise and publicise any misspending or financial misdeeds.

In September 2013, at its annual general meeting, the VUWSA Executive moved amendments to the Constitution so that non-VUWSA members would be able to vote in elections for the VUWSA Executive. This constitutional amendment, among others, were passed by the meeting. VUWSA President Rory McCourt argued the amendments were necessary because "[VUWSA's] about serving all students, and serving them equally. We believe all students have the right to choose who their representatives are”. Salient news editor Chris McIntyre wrote that "VUWSA effectively has a mandate to speak for all students again".  The changes allowed non-members to vote in the 2013 VUWSA elections held in early October.

University Council representation
After the introduction of VSM, in late 2011, VUWSA lost its seat on Victoria University's University Council as it was seen by the university as no longer having a universal mandate. Instead, the university created a new representative body, the Student Forum, and assigned the chair of that body to be on the University Council. VUWSA eventually withdrew support for the Student Forum, and an intensive representation review was conducted throughout 2013 to canvas student opinion on alternative arrangements. After the recommendations of the representation review were finalised, in December 2013 the University Council of Victoria University voted to give VUWSA back its seat on the council. President Rory McCourt commented: "There was much confusion when the Act Party's Voluntary Student Membership law was introduced, but we're heartened our University sees benefit in returning VUWSA to the heart of student representation at Victoria”. The move means that VUWSA is the first students' association in New Zealand to win back its seat on a university council. VUWSA's representative will sit on the University Council alongside another student representative elected at large by students.

VUWSA after the introduction of VSM: 2014–2018

In July 2014, VUWSA President Sonya Clark reflected on the impact of voluntary student membership two years after the change:

Despite the challenges Clark outlined, she was optimistic about the future of the association, noting that the finances are projected to be out of deficit and the relationship with the university has improved. As part of a process of self-evaluation, VUWSA engaged an independent reviewer to investigate relationships with key partners. The reviewer found that: "VUWSA tries to do too many things, that our reputation rests too much on who is the President at the time, and that VUWSA doesn't speak enough for the ‘average’ student", findings that VUWSA agreed with.

In September 2014, VUWSA President Sonya Clark announced that after a unanimous vote by the executive, VUWSA would be withdrawing from the New Zealand Union of Students' Associations (NZUSA), saving VUWSA $45,000 every year in membership fees. President Clark said:

In September 2015, students voted in a referendum (at the same time as Executive elections) to rejoin NZUSA. 1,251 students (72 per cent) voted for VUWSA to rejoin, while 476 students (28 per cent) voted to stay withdrawn.

Increasing engagement and activism, 2018–2020

In March 2018, VUWSA together with the VUW Law Students Society marched to the offices of Russel McVeagh in Wellington to protest the growing culture of sexual violence in law firms. In August 2018, VUWSA led a student march to Parliament demanding higher funding for mental health support for tertiary students.

In September 2018, Tamatha Paul became the first ever Māori wahine to be elected president of VUWSA. She led an executive where the majority were people of colour. Paul went on to be elected to Wellington City Council while still President.

The 2019 Executive elections saw the largest number of candidates running for exec positions at 28. This saw the election of the first immigrant student as president in the person of Philippine-born law student Geo Robrigado. He previously served as chairperson of the volunteer corps of University of the Philippines Los Baños University Student Council, and is the oldest to be elected president at 32.

COVID-19, Wellington Student Volunteer Army, referendums and further campaigns, 2020–present
In response to the outbreak of the COVID-19 global pandemic in 2020, New Zealand Prime Minister Jacinda Ardern put the country under a Level 4 Nationwide Lockdown on March 25, 2020. This saw VUWSA operate primarily off-campus and online. Crucial services, such as community pantry operated under tight supervision and was later incorporated as part of the services of the Wellington Student Volunteer Army. The Wellington Student Volunteer Army was a local initiative to run errands and support those who were confined to their homes during the lockdown period. The Wellington Student Volunteer Army was supported by VUWSA, with a majority of the 2020 Executive being involved.

2020 also saw the rise of significant student issues, such as Victoria University's controversial decision to charge a "Hall's placeholder fee" during the lockdown period. This was met with strong opposition from VUWSA, local politicians and the public. Following backlash, on 1 May 2020 university leadership reversed their position on the fees. Other controversial issues that arose were that of a "5% grade bump", which VUWSA heavily petitioned in favour of, and the Whiria Project which has been shelved following negative responses.

In June 2020, elected VUWSA President, Geo Robrigado resigned citing deterioration of his physical and mental health (At 32, Geo was the oldest to be elected president of VUWSA). Robrigado is the first VUWSA President in four decades to step down. Elected Education Officer and interim Academic Vice President, Taylah Shuker, consequently replaced Robrigado.

The 2020 Executive elections saw the election of incumbent Welfare Vice President, Michael Turnbull as VUWSA President. In terms of representation, the elected 2021 Executive was 70% female and 30% male.

VUWSA endorsed a "yes" vote in the 2020 New Zealand cannabis referendum, "after 75 per cent of students voted in favour in the annual association referendum".

In response to the ongoing effects of the COVID-19 pandemic, 2021 saw increased activism from VUWSA, focused on COVID-19 resiliency and response. With the transition to dual-delivery teaching and learning in March 2021, VUWSA successfully campaigned against the use of exam invigilation software, ProctorU; citing issues of  equity, privacy, troubleshooting, reliability and cost. Alongside other student representative groups, 2021 saw VUWSA lobby on a number of social issues from pastoral care, the banning of conversion therapy in New Zealand, and the Wellington City Council spatial and long-term plan.

In March 2021, VUWSA was a founding member of the Wellington Alliance Against Sexual Violence and helped organise a rally which saw over 500 demonstrators. In May 2021, the Wellington City Council announced a $7.7 million investment targeting city safety, sexual violence, and alcohol harm.

In July 2021, VUWSA launched a campaign for free public transport with a petition which called on the Government to trial free public transport for students and Community Services Card holders in the Wellington region. The petition attracted over 3,000 signatures. As part of this campaign, VUWSA helped establish and organise the Pōneke Collective for Public Transport Equity, which consists of around 40 organisations. The Collective has made submissions to the Greater Wellington Regional Council and is in ongoing conversations with the Minister for Transport, Michael Wood.

In September 2021, VUWSA, Mauri Ora, and a number of student representative groups organised a three-day COVID-19 mass vaccination event in The Hub, Kelburn Campus. This saw over 500 people receive the Pfizer–BioNTech COVID-19 vaccine.

2021 also saw a number of changes to the operations and management of Victoria University of Wellington, with VUWSA involved with changes to the Student Service Levy and the introduction of the Student Success Programme (Tītoko).  Notably, in an email sent to staff and students on 9 August 2021, Vice-Chancellor Grant Guilford announced his retirement with his departure set for March 2022.

The outbreak of the SARS-CoV-2 Delta variant in New Zealand led to another nationwide lockdown in August 2021, with Alert Level restrictions in effect through to October. Consequently the 2021 Executive election was postponed from its original date and was primarily run online. Despite low voter turnout, the election resulted in one of the most diverse VUWSA Executives in VUWSA history. The incumbent Welfare Vice President, Ralph Zambrano, was elected as VUWSA President, the first New Zealand-born Filipino VUWSA President. For the first time, the elected President and Vice Presidents were all of Asian descent.

Notable alumni
Notable previous executive members include:
 Professor Margaret Clark (born 1941), emeritus professor of politics at Victoria University of Wellington (1961–1962, Women's Vice President)
 Fleur Fitzsimons, Wellington City Councillor (2000, Education Officer; 2001, Welfare VP; 2002, President)
 Chris Hipkins (born 1978), Prime Minister, Cabinet Minister, Member of Parliament (2000–2001, President)
 Sue Kedgley (born 1948), former Green Party Member of Parliament (1967–1968, Executive)
 Andrew Little (born 1965), leader of Labour Party, leader of the Opposition, Cabinet Minister, Member of Parliament (1987, President)
 Sir Tipene O'Regan (born 1939), academic and company director (1960–1961, Executive)
 Ian McKinnon (born 1943), former Deputy Mayor of Wellington and VUW Chancellor (1966–1967, Men's Vice President)
 Tamatha Paul (born 1997), Wellington City Councillor (2016–2017, Equity Officer; 2018, Engagement Vice President; 2019, President)
 Whetu Tirikatene-Sullivan (born 1932), former Cabinet Minister (1960–1961, Vice President)
 Guy Williams (born 1987), comedian (2009, Activities Officer)

See also
List of New Zealand tertiary students' associations
Tertiary education in New Zealand

References

Further reading
 S. Hamilton, A Radical Tradition: A History of the Victoria University of Wellington Students' Association 1899–1999, VUWSA in association with Steele Roberts Publishers, 2002,

External links

 

1899 establishments in New Zealand
 
Students' associations in New Zealand
Victoria University of Wellington